The Arak toothcarp (Aphanius arakensis) is a species of pupfish belonging to the family Cyprinodontidae. Discovered in 2012, it is endemic to the Namak Lake basin in Iran.

Description 
Male fish reach approximately 32mm in length, whereas the generally larger females reach approximately 34mm. Males possess grey beards and dark bodies; their anal, dorsal, and caudal fins have white margins. Their pelvic and pectoral fins are yellowish. Females have a greyish pigmentation on their backs, and they have lighter heads and bellies. All their fins are white.

Etymology 
The species gets its name from where it is found— the city of Arak, the capital of the Markazi province in Iran.

References 

Fish of Iran
Aphanius
Taxa named by Azad Teimori
Taxa named by Hamid Reza Esmaeili
Taxa named by Zeinab Gholami
Taxa named by Neda Zarei
Taxa named by Bettina Reichenbacher
Fish described in 2012